Pangonius mauritanus is a species of horse fly in the family Tabanidae.

Distribution
Europe, North Africa

References

Tabanidae
Diptera of Europe
Diptera of Africa
Taxa named by Carl Linnaeus
Insects described in 1767